Ulf Grenander (23 July 1923 – 12 May 2016) was a Swedish statistician and professor of applied mathematics at Brown University.

His early research was in probability theory, stochastic processes, time series analysis, and statistical theory (particularly the order-constrained estimation of cumulative distribution functions using his sieve estimator). In recent decades, Grenander contributed to computational statistics, image processing, pattern recognition, and artificial intelligence. He coined the term pattern theory to distinguish from pattern recognition.

Honors
In 1966 Grenander was elected to the Royal Academy of Sciences of Sweden, and in 1996 to the US National Academy of Sciences. In 1998 he was an Invited Speaker of the International Congress of Mathematicians in Berlin. He received an honorary doctorate in 1994 from the University of Chicago, and in 2005 from the Royal Institute of Technology of Stockholm, Sweden.

Education
Grenander earned his undergraduate degree at Uppsala University. He earned his Ph.D. at Stockholm University in 1950 under the supervision of Harald Cramér.

Appointments
He was active as a 1950–1951 Associate Professor at Stockholm University, 1951–1952 at University of Chicago, At 1952–1953 University of California–Berkeley, At Stockholm University 1953–1957, at Brown University 1957–1958 and 1958–1966 again at Stockholm University, where he succeeded in 1959 Harald Cramér as the Professor in actuarial science and mathematical statistics. From 1966 until his retirement, Grenander was L. Herbert Ballou University Professor at Brown University. In 1969–1974 he was also professor of Applied Mathematics at The Royal Institute of Technology.

Selected works

References

External links

 Homepage of Ulf Grenander at Brown University
 Pattern Theory: Grenander's Ideas and Examples – a video lecture by David Mumford
 

1923 births
2016 deaths
Swedish mathematicians
Swedish statisticians
American statisticians
Mathematical analysts
Probability theorists
20th-century American mathematicians
21st-century American mathematicians
Brown University faculty
Academic staff of the KTH Royal Institute of Technology
Stockholm University alumni
Uppsala University alumni
Swedish emigrants to the United States
People from Västervik Municipality
Members of the United States National Academy of Sciences
Members of the Royal Swedish Academy of Sciences
Mathematical statisticians
Artificial intelligence researchers